Ron Reynolds may refer to:

 Ron Reynolds (politician) (born 1973), American lawyer and member of the Texas House of Representatives
 Ron Reynolds (footballer, born 1928) (1928–1999), English football goalkeeper
 Ron Reynolds (Australian footballer) (1916–1992), Australian rules footballer